Viktor Fischer (9 October 1892 – 1977) was an Austrian wrestler. He competed at the 1912 Summer Olympics and the 1924 Summer Olympics.

References

External links
 

1892 births
1977 deaths
Olympic wrestlers of Austria
Wrestlers at the 1912 Summer Olympics
Wrestlers at the 1924 Summer Olympics
Austrian male sport wrestlers
Sportspeople from Graz